Vladimir Shelkov (December 20, 1895 – January 27, 1980) was a Christian preacher and Seventh-day Adventist leader in the former Soviet Union. He headed the Church of True and Free Seventh-day Adventists, which rejected any government interference in the activities.

Vladimir was born in Velyka Vyska village of Kherson Governorate in today Ukraine.

In 1931 Shelkov was imprisoned for the first time by the Soviet regime and spent almost all his life in prisons and camps. In 1946 Shelkov had been sentenced to capital punishment, which later was changed for 10 years imprisonment. His last confinement began in 1979, when a Soviet court in Tashkent sentenced him (then a delicate eighty-three-year-old man) to five years of hard labor camps.

He died in a labor camp Tabaga near Yakutsk in 1980.

References

1895 births
1980 deaths
People from Kirovohrad Oblast
People from Yelisavetgradsky Uyezd
Ukrainian Christian religious leaders
Former Seventh-day Adventists
Soviet dissidents